Allium brevidentatum is a plant species endemic to the Province of Shandong in eastern China. It grows on sun-lit hillsides.

Allium brevidentatum produces a cylindrical bulb. Scape is up to 30 cm tall, mostly round in cross-section but with a few fine angles near the top. Flowers are pale yellow-green.

References

brevidentatum
Flora of Shandong
Flora of China
Onions
Plants described in 1986